SADP may refer to :

Science and Technology
Self-Aligned Double-Patterning, a Multiple patterning technique used in semiconductor manufacturing
Selected Area Diffraction Pattern, the pattern of spots in Selected area diffraction
sADP, "slow after depolarizing current", an experimental response of Neurons

Other
El Palomar Airport, Argentina - ICAO code SADP
The School of Architecture, Design, and Planning (SADP), former name of the University of Kansas School of Architecture, Design, and Planning
The Socialist Alliance Democracy Platform, a left wing electoral alliance in England (1992-2005)